Yo-Yo Ma Plays Ennio Morricone is a 2004 album of recordings from Morricone's various film scores by cellist Yo-Yo Ma and Ennio Morricone. The album was recorded with the Roma Sinfonietta Orchestra and Gilda Buttà on piano. Morricone functioned as orchestrator, conductor, and producer. It was released as a standard compact disc on September 28, 2004 (093456), and a DualDisc using Dolby Digital 5.1 Surround Sound on February 8, 2005 (093472). Ma also toured a suite of Morricone's music.

The album stayed 105 weeks on the Billboard Top Classical Albums.

Track listing
The Mission
"Gabriel's Oboe" – 3:11
"The Mission: The Falls" – 2:27
Giuseppe Tornatore Suite
"The Legend of 1900: Playing Love" – 1:49
"Cinema Paradiso: Nostalgia" – 1:58
"Cinema Paradiso: Looking for You" – 1:43
"Malèna: Main Theme" – 4:22
"A Pure Formality: Main Theme" – 3:49
Sergio Leone Suite
"Once Upon a Time in America: Deborah's Theme" – 3:32
"Once Upon a Time in America: Cockeye's Song" – 2:13
"Once Upon a Time in America: Main Theme" – 1:49
"Once Upon a Time in the West: Main Theme" – 3:21
"The Good, the Bad, and the Ugly: Ecstasy of Gold" – 3:57
Brian De Palma Suite
"Casualties of War: Main Theme" – 3:54
"The Untouchables: Death Theme" – 3:10
Moses and Marco Polo Suite
"Moses: Journey" – 2:34
"Moses: Main Theme" – 2:07
"Marco Polo: Main Theme" – 3:21
The Lady Caliph
"Dinner" – 3:51
"Nocturne" – 2:33

References

External links
Sony's homepage
Yo-Yo Ma Plays Ennio Morricone
 

2004 albums
Yo-Yo Ma albums
Ennio Morricone albums
Instrumental albums
Sony Classical Records albums